Bosko in Person is an American animated short film featuring Bosko. It is a Looney Tunes cartoon, featuring Bosko, the original star of the series. It was released on February 11, 1933, though one source claims the release date is April 10, 1933. Like most Looney Tunes of its day, it was directed by Hugh Harman; its score is by Frank Marsales. The film features Bosko and Honey in a vaudeville-act. This is the second cartoon directed by Friz Freleng.

Summary
The title card is a curtain; it parts, revealing an asbestos sheath, which paradoxically burns up to reveal the stage. There sits Bosko at a piano, playing, scatting, occasionally snapping his fingers; then enters Honey. In time with the music, they greet each other. Bosko leaps from his stool and the couple dance. As the number ends, Honey intones, "Gee, Bosko, you're swell." Our hero steps over and, bathed in the spotlight, his sweetheart having departed for the moment, sings an ode to Honey and their mutual love. As this yields to further dancing and scatting, Honey re-enters and the two complete the number to an unseen audience's applause. They run off stage, hand-in-hand, and Bosko stumbles cheerfully back on an instant later. Returning to his instrument, he repeats the melody from the opening, supplementing the theme twice by casting off his right glove, which tumbles leftward along the keys and then hurries back on its fingers (as if on foot) the first time to its master's hand and the second to Bosko's right knee, where it stands, endowed with a face and a voice of its own.

"Well, what can you do?" Bosko asks. "I don't know," replies the glove. Bosko thrice enjoins the glove to demonstrate its talents and thrice it refuses. "Now," undauntedly says Bosko, "say 'Mary Had a Little Lamb.'" Giggling with modesty, and at Bosko's repeated request, the glove obliges; it gives another bashful laugh before returning to Bosko's hand. The pianist plays "Shave and a Haircut'," and, descending from his stool again, tap dances in the same rhythm. Seeming-nervously, he begins another tap dance and, tipping his hat, taps stage left; graceful at first, our hero loses his balance after a moment and falls. The audience roars with laughter. Picking himself up, Bosko dusts off his hat, and, donning it again, feigns a limp stage right before hopping on one foot and turning then to skip a bit leftward. He repeats the tap dance-routine from before and falls just as before. Enter Honey from the right, skipping: in a raspy voice she scats "Was That the Human Thing to Do?" She exits and returns a moment later in outsize shoes: donning a long, blond wig and extending her chin, she states, "I think I go home now," in a probable homage to Greta Garbo. As she marches sultrily off, Bosko marches in time behind her, straw hat in hand, chin firmly in the air: he waits a moment for the audience's applause for Honey before he begins his Maurice Chevalier-impression. In time with the film's theme music, he sings, "Just whistle and blow your blues away."

Ridding himself of the straw hat, he hurries toward the piano, pulls a balloon from his pocket, inflates it, and places it before his nose. Now an obvious caricature of Jimmy Durante, he sits at the keyboard and plays as he states, "I know I'm not good looking, folks. But what's one opinion against a million?" The audience are now a chorus of boos. Huffing, Bosko-Durante dons a rumpled fedora (apparently stored within the piano) and complains, "Am I mortified? Am I mortified?!" as he tosses the hat to the floor. Audience and Honey applaud. Bosko then begins scatting and leaping about madly and playing trumpet; Honey dances passionately, the lights around her flashing; Bosko bangs on the various percussive instruments lining the stage and repeats his failed tap dance again, falling this time into a large drum off of stage left. Popping out, he briefly becomes Durante again: "Am I mortified?" He takes, apparently from within the drum, a wilted silk hat, puts it on, and, producing a clarinet from nowhere in particular, begins to play in the fashion of Ted Lewis as he walks stage right. Releasing his clarinet and tipping the hat, he most fittingly asks, "Is everybody happy?" A face upon a bass drum that stands next to Bosko concurs with "Whoopee!" Bosko takes up the instrument and bangs it in time to the music of "America" as he marches rightward; the man on the drum produces and brandishes a stein of beer as the drummer does so. Honey enters waving an American flag and Bosko proceeds to his exit.

The face on the drum
It has been suggested that the man depicted on the drum is Ted Lewis, whom Bosko certainly imitates in his act; although this is possible, the face also bears a passing resemblance to that of President Franklin D. Roosevelt. That the figure is Roosevelt is strengthened by the fact of that president's recent inauguration (on March 4 of the year the cartoon was released) and the figure's holding a glass of beer, signaling the pending repeal of Prohibition, a measure favored by the president.

Home media
The short was released on the Looney Tunes Golden Collection: Volume 6, disc three.

References

External links
 

1933 films
1933 animated films
American black-and-white films
African-American animated films
Films scored by Frank Marsales
Animated films about music and musicians
Films about theatre
Films directed by Hugh Harman
Bosko films
Looney Tunes shorts
Warner Bros. Cartoons animated short films
Vitaphone short films
Cultural depictions of Jimmy Durante
Cultural depictions of Maurice Chevalier
Short films directed by Friz Freleng
1930s Warner Bros. animated short films
1930s English-language films